Aladakatti (K.Y.) is a village in Belgaum district in the southern state of Karnataka, India.

Villages in Belagavi district